John Dowson M.R.A.S.(1820–1881) was a British indologist. A noted scholar of Hinduism, he taught in India for much of his life. His book Classical Dictionary of Hindu Mythology remains one of the most comprehensive and authoritative works on the topic.

Life
He was born at Uxbridge, and studied Eastern languages under his uncle Edwin Norris, whom he assisted for some years at the Royal Asiatic Society. He subsequently became a tutor at the East India Company College. In 1855, he was made professor of Hindustani both at University College, London, and at the Staff College, Sandhurst, a post he held till 1877. He died 23 August 1881.

Works
Dowson's duties as professor suggested his Grammar of the Urdu or Hindustani Language (1862), and he also translated one of the tracts of the Ikhwānu-s-Safa, or Brotherhood of Purity. His major work was The History of India, as Told by Its Own Historians. The Muhammadan Period, which he edited from the papers of Henry Miers Elliot, in eight volumes (1867–77). He compiled the Classical Dictionary of Hindu Mythology and Religion, History and Literature (1879), and contributed to the Encyclopædia Britannica and the Journal of the Royal Asiatic Society. His theory of the Invention of the Indian Alphabet, claiming a Hindu origin, met with little support.

Notes

References
Katherine Prior. "Dowson, John (1820–1881)",Oxford Dictionary of National Biography, Sept 2004
Attribution

External links

 

1820 births
1881 deaths
British orientalists